Nancy Anne Kress (born January 20, 1948) is an American science fiction writer. She began writing in 1976 but has achieved her greatest notice since the publication of her Hugo- and Nebula-winning 1991 novella Beggars in Spain, which became a novel in 1993. She also won the Nebula Award for Best Novella in 2013 for After the Fall, Before the Fall, During the Fall, and in 2015 for Yesterday's Kin. In addition to her novels, Kress has written numerous short stories and is a regular columnist for Writer's Digest.  She is a regular at Clarion writing workshops. During the winter of 2008/09, Nancy Kress was the Picador Guest Professor for Literature at the University of Leipzig's Institute for American Studies in Leipzig, Germany.

Biography

Born Nancy Anne Koningisor in Buffalo, New York, she grew up in East Aurora and attended college at SUNY Plattsburgh and graduated with an M.A. in English. Before starting her writing career she taught elementary school and then college English. In 1973, she moved to Rochester to marry Michael Joseph Kress.  They had two sons, and divorced in 1984.  At that time, she went to work at Stanton and Hucko, an advertising agency. She was married to Marcos Donnelly from 1988 to 1994.

In 1998, she married fellow author Charles Sheffield, who died in 2002 of a brain tumor. Kress moved back to Rochester, New York, to be near her grown children. In 2009, she moved to Seattle. In February 2011, she married author Jack Skillingstead.

Work

Kress tends to write hard science fiction, or technically realistic stories, often set in a fairly near future. Her fiction often involves genetic engineering and, to a lesser degree, artificial intelligence.  There are many invented technologies shared between her stories, including "genemod", to refer to genetic engineering, and "foamcast", a lightweight and sturdy building material that appears in many of her novels and short stories.

By conducting extensive research, she keeps her topics within the realm of possibility; however, as Kress clarified for one Locus interviewer, with regards to her partner and fellow science fiction writer, "[Sheffield] pronounces it science fiction, and I pronounce it science fiction."

Kress also loves ballet, and has written stories around it.

Awards

Nebula Awards
Best Short Story winner (1986): "Out of All Them Bright Stars", F&SF March 1985
Best Novella  (1991): Beggars in Spain  (Axolotl Press / Pulphouse Feb. 1991) / Asimov's April 1991
Best Novelette  (1998): "The Flowers of Aulit Prison", Asimov's Oct./Nov. 1996
Best Novella  (2007): "Fountain of Age",  Asimov's July 2007
Best Novella (2012): "After the Fall, Before the Fall, During the Fall", Tachyon Publications
Best Novella (2014): "Yesterday's Kin", Tachyon Publications
Hugo Award
Best Novella  (1992): Beggars in Spain (Axolotl Press / Pulphouse Feb. 1991) / Asimov's April 1991
Best Novella  (2009): "The Erdmann Nexus", Asimov's Oct./Nov. 2008
John W. Campbell Memorial Award
Best Novel (2003): Probability Space, (Tor Sep. 2002)
Theodore Sturgeon Memorial Award
Best Short Science Fiction (1997): "The Flowers of Aulit Prison", Asimov's Oct./Nov. 1996

Bibliography

References

External links 

 Official website
 Bibliography at FantasticFiction
 Blog – inactive since February 2013
 
1993 interview at ConFuse
1996 interview
2000 interview at Fictionwise
2001 interview excerpts in Locus Magazine
2007 interview at Writer Unboxed
2008 interview at Dark Roasted Blend
2008 interview at Futurismic
2008 interview at Feminist SF – The Blog!
2010 interview excerpts in Locus Magazine
2016 interview excerpts in Locus Magazine
2016 interview in Lightspeed Magazine, focusing on the release of The Best of Nancy Kress
 Fiction by Kress at Free Speculative Fiction Online
 
 Anna Kendall at LC Authorities, with 1 record

1948 births
Living people
American science fiction writers
Hugo Award-winning writers
Nebula Award winners
Writers from Buffalo, New York
Writers of books about writing fiction
Science fiction academics
State University of New York at Plattsburgh alumni
Women science fiction and fantasy writers
American women novelists
20th-century American novelists
21st-century American novelists
20th-century American women writers
21st-century American women writers
Asimov's Science Fiction people
Novelists from New York (state)